Šišan is a village in the municipality of Ližnjan, in southern Istria in Croatia. In 2001 it had a population of 623.

References

Populated places in Istria County